William Lyne Crawford (January 23, 1839 - February 17, 1920) was an American Confederate veteran, criminal lawyer and politician. He was "considered the leading criminal lawyer in Texas."

Biography
William Crawford was born to Jeptha and Catherine Crawford in Clay County, Kentucky. The family moved to Texas in 1843.

During the American Civil War of 1861–1865, he served as a colonel in the Confederate States Army.

As a member of the Constitutional Convention of Texas held in 1875, Crawford succeeded in having a clause inserted in the constitution providing for the popular election of all judges. Years later he stated that it was a great mistake; that they should have been appointed.

He served as a Democratic member of the Texas House of Representatives from 1892 to 1893.

References

1839 births
1920 deaths
Military personnel from Dallas
Confederate States Army officers
Democratic Party members of the Texas House of Representatives
Texas lawyers
People from Clay County, Kentucky
19th-century American lawyers